Cave City High School is a comprehensive public high school located in the fringe town of Cave City, Arkansas, United States. The school provides secondary education for students in grades 9 through 12. It is one of three public high schools in Sharp County, Arkansas and the sole high school administered by the Cave City School District.

Academics 
Cave City High School is accredited by the Arkansas Department of Education (ADE). The assumed course of study follows the Smart Core curriculum developed by the ADE. Students complete regular (core and elective) and career focus coursework and exams and may take Advanced Placement (AP) courses and exams with the opportunity to receive college credit.

Extracurricular activities 
The Cave City High School mascot and athletic emblem is the Caveman with red and white serving as the school colors.

Athletics 
The Cave City Cavemen compete in interscholastic activities within the 4A Classification via the 4A Region 3 Conference, as administered by the Arkansas Activities Association. The Cavemen field teams in football, golf (boys/girls), tennis (boys/girls), basketball (boys/girls), baseball, softball, track and field (boys/girls), and cheer.

References

External links 
 

Public high schools in Arkansas
Schools in Sharp County, Arkansas